WCNI (90.9 FM) is a radio station  broadcasting a freeform format and licensed to New London, Connecticut, serving the New London area.  The station is owned by Connecticut College Community Radio, Inc. and is operated by students and members of the community. The station features eclectic musical genres that are less often heard on the majority of radio stations.

History
WCNI was originally an on-campus AM radio station broadcast to Connecticut College students and staff via low-power carrier current transmitters placed in college dormitories and facilities. The presence of the station encouraged engagement in media arts, although the quality of its signal was typically poor and its interference with the broadcast signal of New York City's WNBC led to students sometimes turning off the transmitters in their dormitories. The station filed an application with the Federal Communications Commission (FCC) on August 10, 1972 for 89.9 MHz. A series of opposition letters were filed by WGAL Television, Inc., owner of WTEV/6 in New Bedford, Massachusetts, so Connecticut College modified their request to 91.5 MHz on May 10, 1973. A construction permit was finally granted on October 3, 1973 to allow WCNI to transmit on 91.5 MHz. The application was filed by the Connecticut College Broadcast Association, Inc., a non-profit corporation established to limit the college's liabilities from the station's broadcasts to the general public. The call sign was assigned by the FCC on March 11, 1974.

In 1974, WCNI made its debut on 91.5 MHz with ten watts of transmission power, one of a wave of college radio stations introduced in that era using low-power FM transmission facilities. Early station promotional spots created by student and staff member Ken Abel hailed it as having "less power than a common light bulb." Subsequent increases in transmission power led to a reassignment of its frequency to 91.1 MHz and eventually to the current 90.9 MHz. The original antenna tower for FM transmissions was erected atop Bill Hall on the Connecticut College campus using a World War II air raid siren tower as its base, modified by Connecticut College maintenance staff to hold a steel pipe which acted as an antenna mast. The antenna was subsequently relocated to a professionally installed tower next to the Crozier-Williams student center on the Connecticut College campus, adjacent to the station's studios and recording archives.

Early broadcasts of the FM radio station were wide-ranging, including a variety of music genres, old radio serial dramas, local history, and live performances. To raise funds for government-mandated emergency broadcast equipment, the station held its first on-air fund raising marathon in the spring of 1975. The early FM broadcast signal of WCNI was not strong, but the station had a notable body of off-campus listeners in the New London area and its on-air staff included non-student members from the community.

The station's proximity to the U.S. Navy submarine base across the Thames River in Gales Ferry, Connecticut and to the General Dynamics submarine manufacturing facility in Groton led to its nickname "Ground Zero Radio", in recognition of the region's presumed high priority as a Soviet nuclear strike site.

References

External links

Connecticut College
New London, Connecticut
Mass media in New London County, Connecticut
CNI
CNI
Radio stations established in 1974
1974 establishments in Connecticut